The 2021 Montana State Bobcats football team represented Montana State University as a member of the Big Sky Conference during the 2021 NCAA Division I FCS football season. The Bobcats were led by first-year head coach Brent Vigen and played their home games at Bobcat Stadium in Bozeman, Montana.

The Bobcats finished their regular season with a 9–2 record (7–1 in conference), losing only to Wyoming (an FBS team) and Montana. They were seeded eighth in the FCS postseason tournament and received a first-round bye; they then defeated UT Martin, Sam Houston, and South Dakota State to advance to the final match of the tournament. In the championship game, the Bobcats were defeated by North Dakota State on January 8, 2022, in Frisco, Texas.

Previous season
The Bobcats opted out of the 2020–21 FCS season, contested during the COVID-19 pandemic in the United States. During the 2019 FCS season, the Bobcats finished at 11–4 overall, 6–2 in Big Sky play to finish in a three-way tie for third place. They received an at-large bid to the FCS Playoffs where, after a first round bye, they defeated Albany in the second round and Austin Peay in the quarterfinals before losing in the semifinals to North Dakota State.

Preseason
On July 26, 2021, during the virtual Big Sky Kickoff, the Bobcats were predicted to finish fourth in the Big Sky by both the coaches and media.

Preseason All–Big Sky team
The Bobcats had two players selected to the preseason all-Big Sky team.

Offense

Taylor Tuiasosopo – OL

Defense

Troy Andersen – OLB

Schedule

Roster

Game summaries

at Wyoming

Drake

San Diego

at Portland State

Northern Colorado

Cal Poly

at No. 19 Weber State

Idaho State

at Eastern Washington

Idaho

at No. 7 Montana

Ranking movements

References

Montana State
Montana State Bobcats football seasons
2021 NCAA Division I FCS playoff participants
Montana State Bobcats football